The Ven. Samuel Rolleston, MA (Oxon), a Canon of Salisbury Cathedral, held livings at Stanton, Derbyshire and Aston upon Trent; and was Archdeacon of Sarum from 12 July 1732 until his death  on 2 May 1766.

References

Date of birth unknown
1766 deaths
Alumni of Oriel College, Oxford
Archdeacons of Sarum
18th-century English Anglican priests